Roman Schatz (born 21 August 1960 in Überlingen, Baden-Württemberg, West Germany) is a German-born Finnish journalist and author. He has written more than two dozen books, many of which have also been published in Germany. His first book was called From Finland with love – Suomesta rakkaudella.

Schatz translates, gives talks, hosts events and writes columns for Finnish newspapers and magazines. He has hosted his own TV series (Toisten TV) and appeared on various other TV shows and in movies (e.g. The Border, Better than Andy, Rottatouille). Since 2013, Schatz has hosted his own radio show, Roman Schatzin Maamme-kirja, on Yle Radio 1 Finnish Broadcasting Company.

Roman Schatz met the Finnish woman who would later become his first wife in Berlin in 1986. Later that same year he emigrated to Finland. In 2012, Schatz became a Finnish citizen and thus holds dual citizenship.

Schatz has three children from two former marriages. He resides in Helsinki.

Selected works
 Schmid, Max & Schatz, Roman: Finnland (Luzern: Reich, 1993) – 
 From Finland with love – Suomesta, rakkaudella (Helsinki: Johnny Kniga, 2005) - 
 Rakasta minut (Helsinki: WSOY, 2006) - 
 € (Helsinki: WSOY, 2007) - 
 Der König von Helsinki (Frankfurt am Main: Eichborn, 2007) - 
 Pravda. The truth about the Leningrad Cowboys (Helsinki: WSOY, 2008) - 
 Telewischn! (Frankfurt am Main: Eichborn, 2009) - 
 Berliini. Oppaana Roman Schatz (Helsinki: WSOY, 2012) - 
 Voi maamme Suomi / Finland, what a country (Helsinki: WSOY, 2014) - 
 Gebrauchsanweisung für Finnland (München: Piper, 2014) - 
 Asevelipuolet (Helsinki: Gummerus, 2017) -

External links

 Home page
 Roman Schatz on Internet Movie Database
 Roman Schatz in the New York Times

1960 births
Living people
People from Überlingen
Finnish writers
Finnish columnists
Finnish television presenters
Finnish radio presenters
German emigrants to Finland
Naturalized citizens of Finland